Sir William Hamilton Fyfe  (9 July 1878 – 13 June 1965) was an English and Canadian classics scholar, educator, and educational administrator. He served as the 10th Principal of Queen's University, Ontario, from 1930 to 1936, and was the first layman to hold that position. He served as Principal and Vice-Chancellor of the University of Aberdeen from 1936 to 1948. He was knighted in 1942.

Life

William Hamilton Fyfe was born in Kensington, London in 1878. He attended Fettes College in Edinburgh, Scotland. He then went on to Merton College, Oxford, where he graduated with a double first in Classics. He taught at Radley College from 1901 to 1903. He then returned to Merton to teach for 15 years. 

He married Dorothea Hope Geddes White in 1908; the couple had three children, Maurice, Margaret, and Christopher.

During World War I, he served as a major with the British Intelligence Department of the War Office. In 1919 he was appointed headmaster of Christ's Hospital in Sussex, where he modernized the curriculum and authored several classical texts.

In 1930, he was appointed Principal of Queen's University in Kingston, Ontario, Canada. Fyfe had earlier expressed some disdain for the standard of education at 'colonial' universities, and so was recruited to improve the standards at Queen's. He had limited success in that task, since Canada was mired in the Great Depression, and funds were very scarce. But he did succeed in modernizing the curriculum somewhat, in raising the level of admission and scholarship, and in attracting increased prestige to Queen's.

He returned to Great Britain in 1936 to accept the position of Principal and Vice Chancellor at the University of Aberdeen in Scotland, where he served until 1948, when he retired. He was knighted by King George VI in 1942 for his many diverse achievements. 

Fyfe died in London in 1965. He is memorialised in the churchyard of St Machar's Cathedral in Old Aberdeen.

Family

He was married to Dorothea Hope Geddes White (1885-1977).

References

External links

 Biography 
 
 

1878 births
1965 deaths
Alumni of Merton College, Oxford
British Army officers
British Army personnel of World War I
English classical scholars
Headmasters of Christ's Hospital
Knights Bachelor
People educated at Fettes College
People from Kensington
Principals of Queen's University at Kingston
Principals of the University of Aberdeen